Sadomania – Hölle der Lust is a 1981 German-Spanish women in prison film directed by Jesús Franco, starring Ajita Wilson. It was also released as Hellhole Women, Prisoners of the Flesh and Sadomania: The Hell of Passion.

Plot
A couple of newlyweds, Olga (Uta Koepke) and Michael (Ángel Caballero), are traveling along the desert and accidentally trespass on the property of Magda Urtado (Ajita Wilson), who is the director of "Sadomania", a boot camp of sorts, where the women are treated as slaves and are half naked at all times. Magda keeps Olga in captivity while Michael is free to go, but later on in the film he plans an escape for Olga. She goes to work with the other girls out in the hot desert, and the rest of the film is a series of subplots, including one in which a few of the workers are sent out to be hookers, one where a worker participates in a deadly game of cat-and-mouse, and one where the impotent Governor Mendoza (Antonio Mayans, billed as Robert Foster) buys a couple of the workers to help him perform. There is also a scene where the Governor is finally able to have sex with his wife, but only while watching one of the workers being raped by a dog. Director Jesús Franco also stars in the movie as an obviously gay man.

External links

Online Trailer at Blue Underground

1981 films
1981 horror films
Spanish horror films
German horror films
West German films
1980s Spanish-language films
Films directed by Jesús Franco
Sexploitation films
Women in prison films
1980s horror thriller films
Erotic horror films
1980s Spanish films
1980s German films